The following lists events that happened during 2015 in Moldova.

Incumbents 
 President: Nicolae Timofti
 Prime Minister: 
 until 18 February: Iurie Leancă
 18 February- 22 June: Chiril Gaburici 
 22 June-30 July: Natalia Gherman 
 30 July-30 October: Valeriu Streleț 
 starting 30 October: Gheorghe Brega
 President of the Parliament: Igor Corman (until January 23), Andrian Candu (starting January 23)

Events

February 
 18 February - The Moldovan Parliament appoints a new government with Chiril Gaburici as Prime Minister and a legislative support formed by the PLDM, PDM and PCRM.

March 
 19 March - Moldovan authorities ban two Russian journalists, Dmitry Kiselev and Andrei Kondrashov, from the country for five years because they had planned to travel to Moldova to present a documentary sympathetic to Russia annexing the Crimea.

References 

 
2010s in Moldova
Moldova
Moldova
Years of the 21st century in Moldova